Erminio Macario (27 May 1902 – 25 March 1980), best known as Macario, was an Italian film actor and comedian. He appeared in 42 films between 1933 and 1975.

Life and career
Born in Turin, Macario made his debut at a young age in the amateur dramatics company Don Bosco Oratory in Valdocco, then he was part of some small amateur companies in his hometown until 1924. At this time, he was cast in the company of dancing and pantomime of Giovanni Molasso.  Soon after, he entered the company of Wanda Osiris, the  undisputed queen of the revue of that time in Italy. Between the two wars he became, in a short time, one of the most popular comedians of the revue theater.

Macario made his film debut in 1933 with Aria di paese but the success came just six years later with two comedy films directed by Mario Mattoli and co-written by a young Federico Fellini, Imputato alzatevi! and Lo vedi come sei... lo vedi come sei?. After a series of successful comedies directed by Carlo Borghesio since the early fifties Macario appeared in short characterizations in anthology films and was sidekick of Totò in a number of films. Starting from mid-sixties he finally dedicated to television and theater.

His comical style was referred as a mixture between Chaplin's Charlot and Marx Brothers.

Partial filmography

 Country Air (1933) - Mac
 Defendant, Stand Up! (1939) - Cipriano Duval
 Lo vedi come sei... lo vedi come sei? (1939) - Michele Bernisconi
 The Pirate's Dream (1940) - José
 Non me lo dire! (1940) - Michele Colombelli, marchese di Castel Perrone
 Il chiromante (1941) - Candido
 Il vagabondo (1941) - Pippo, il vagabondo
 Il fanciullo del West (1943) - Mac Carey
 Charley's Aunt (1943) - Terenzio
 Arcobaleno (1943)
 Macario Against Zagomar (1944) - Macario Duplessis
 The Innocent Casimiro (1945) - Casimiro Pelagatti
 L'eroe della strada (1948) - Felice Manetti
 How I Lost the War (1948) - Leo Bianchetti
 Adam and Eve (1949) - Adamo Rossi
 How I Discovered America (1949) - Cristoforo Colombo
 Il monello della strada (1950) - Carletto Po
 The Passaguai Family Gets Rich (1952) - Giocondo Diotallevi
 My Wife, My Cow and Me (1952) -  Mario
 I, Hamlet (1952) - Amleto
 Matrimonial Agency (1953) - Peppino
 Carosello del varietà (1955)
 Italia piccola (1957) - Sandrin
 La cambiale (1959) - Tommaso
 Lo smemorato di Collegno (1962) - Nicola Politi
 Toto's First Night (1962) - Mimi Makò
 I 4 monaci (1962) - Fra' Martino
 Sexy Toto (1963) - Mimi Cocco
 Avventura al motel (1963) - Erminio
 Uno strano tipo (1963) - Giovanni
 Totò contro i quattro (1963) - La Matta
 The Monk of Monza (1963) - Fra' Mamozio
 I 4 tassisti (1963) - Pomilio Barone (segment "Caccia al tesoro") 
 The Four Musketeers (1963)
 Lisa dagli occhi blu (1970) - Tramp with the cats
 Nel giorno del signore (1970) - Don Giacinto
 The Mighty Anselmo and His Squire (1972) - Frà Prosdocimo Zatterin da' San Donà di Piave
 Ante Up (1974)
 Due sul pianerottolo (1976) - Prof. Luigi Savoia

References

Further reading 
 Maurizio Ternavasio, Macario: vita di un comico, Lindau, 1998, .

External links

1902 births
1980 deaths
Italian male film actors
20th-century Italian male actors
Actors from Turin
Italian male comedians
20th-century Italian comedians
Italian comedians
Italian male stage actors
Italian male television actors